The WTA Tier I events are part of the elite tour for professional women's tennis organised by the WTA called the WTA Tour.

Tournaments

Results

See also 
 WTA Tier I events
 1994 WTA Tour
 1994 ATP Championship Series, Single Week
 1994 ATP Tour

References

External links
 Women's Tennis Association (WTA) official website
 International Tennis Federation (ITF) official website

WTA 1000 tournaments

 Tier 1